Gian Paolo Dallara (born 16 November 1936) is an Italian businessman and motorsports engineer. He is the owner of Dallara Motorsports, a company that develops racing cars.

Biography
Dallara was born in Parma.

Automotive and motorsport 

He graduated from Politecnico di Milano, majoring in aeronautical engineering. He joined Ferrari in 1960, and next year moved to Maserati. In 1963 he was hired by Lamborghini as their chief designer, where he (along with Paolo Stanzani, and Bob Wallace) designed the chassis of the Lamborghini Espada and Miura. In 1969 he started to design race cars for Frank Williams, founder and manager of the Williams Formula One team.

In 1972, Dallara founded and established Dallara Automobili in Parma, Italy. Starting from 1974, Dallara and his company started designing a Formula One car, the Iso-Marlboro IR, for the Williams Team. Another project included designing a race car to Formula 3 standards. This resulted in victories in Italy, France, England, Switzerland, Germany, Japan, United States, Russia, and Austria.

In 1997, Dallara and his company expanded into IndyCar racing, with many victories from 1998 until 2003. Since 2007, Dallara has been the single chassis supplier for IndyCar.

Dallara branched out into F1 projects in the mid-1990s, and at the end of 1998, Honda, considering a return to F1 as a constructor, called on Dallara to design their new F1 chassis. Honda later cancelled the project.

Beginning in 2000, after the cancellation of the Honda project, Dallara embarked on a new project. He and his team were to build a race car for French team Oreca, in the Le Mans series. In the August 2004, it was announced that Dallara and his team were signed by Alex Shnaider to build a chassis for the erstwhile Jordan team, Midland. Later, Dallara brought along Gary Anderson to handle this project. But by mid-2005, Dallara pulled out from the project.

In 2009, Dallara and his team began a project building an F1 chassis for the new team, Campos Grand Prix, known now as Hispania.

Association Football 

In 2015 Dallara became investor in the phoenix club Parma Calcio 1913 along with Guido Barilla and Mauro Del Rio.

References

1936 births
Engineers from Parma
Living people
Polytechnic University of Milan alumni
Lamborghini people
Ferrari people
Italian motorsport people
Formula One designers
Businesspeople from Parma
Dallara